Food Battle Club (フードバトルクラブ) is a Japanese competitive eating television program by Tokyo Broadcasting System (TBS). Due to a death caused by a bread-eating contest the show was canceled.

References

External links
TBS 
TBS 
TBS page referring to Food Battle Club  

Japanese reality television series
TBS Television (Japan) original programming